The Woodbury Heights School District is a community public school district that serves students in pre-kindergarten through sixth grade from Woodbury Heights, in Gloucester County, New Jersey, United States.

As of the 2019–20 school year, the district, comprised of one school, had an enrollment of 253 students and 23.9 classroom teachers (on an FTE basis), for a student–teacher ratio of 10.6:1.

The district is classified by the New Jersey Department of Education as being in District Factor Group "FG", the fourth-highest of eight groupings. District Factor Groups organize districts statewide to allow comparison by common socioeconomic characteristics of the local districts. From the lowest socioeconomic status to the highest, the categories are A, B, CD, DE, FG, GH, I and J.

For seventh through twelfth grade, public school students attend Gateway Regional High School, a regional public high school established in 1964 that serves students from the boroughs of National Park, Wenonah, Westville and Woodbury Heights, as part of the Gateway Regional High School District. As of the 2019–20 school year, the high school had an enrollment of 900 students and 79.0 classroom teachers (on an FTE basis), for a student–teacher ratio of 11.4:1.

School
Woodbury Heights Elementary School serves students in grades PreK-6. The school served 248 students as of the 2019-20 school year.

Administration
Core members of the district's administration are:
Janis Gansert, Chief School Administrator
Chris Rodia, Business Administrator / Board Secretary

Board of education
The district's board of education, comprised of seven members, sets policy and oversees the fiscal and educational operation of the district through its administration. As a Type II school district, the board's trustees are elected directly by voters to serve three-year terms of office on a staggered basis, with either two or three seats up for election each year held (since 2012) as part of the November general election. The board appoints a superintendent to oversee the day-to-day operation of the district.

References

External links 
Woodbury Heights Elementary School

School Data for the Woodbury Heights Elementary School, National Center for Education Statistics

Woodbury Heights, New Jersey
New Jersey District Factor Group FG
School districts in Gloucester County, New Jersey
Public elementary schools in New Jersey